Pretor is a village in the Resen Municipality of North Macedonia, on the northeastern shore of Lake Prespa.

History
Pretor's oldest church, St Sava, is dated from the 14th century.

Demographics
According to the statistics of Bulgarian ethnographer Vasil Kanchov from 1900 the settlement is recorded as "Pretorče" and as having 138 inhabitants, all Bulgarian Exarchists. Pretor has 142 inhabitants as of the most recent census of 2002. The majority ethnic group in the village has been the Macedonians.

People from Pretor 
Pande Eftimov (1932 - 2017), poet and journalist
Pande Sudžov (1882 - 1927), member of the Internal Macedonian Revolutionary Organization

References

Villages in Resen Municipality